Gerd Nefzer is a German special effects artist. He won an Academy Award for Best Visual Effects for his work as a special effects supervisor on Blade Runner 2049. He shared the award with John Nelson, Paul Lambert and Richard R. Hoover.

In 2022, Nefzer won his second Academy Award for his work on Dune. He shared this Award with Paul Lambert, Tristan Myles and Brian Connor.

References

External links

Visual effects supervisors
Living people
Year of birth missing (living people)
Place of birth missing (living people)
Best Visual Effects Academy Award winners
Best Visual Effects BAFTA Award winners